Marit Velle Kile (born 13 November 1978) is a Norwegian actress appearing in film and television. Kile's most recent appearance was on the TV series Blue Murder playing the role of Marta.

Filmography

External links

Official Site

1978 births
Norwegian film actresses
Norwegian television actresses
Living people
People from Ørsta